Martin Smith (born January 28, 1949) is a producer, writer, director and correspondent. Smith has produced dozens of nationally broadcast documentaries for CBS News, ABC News and PBS Frontline. His films range in topic from war in the Middle East to the 2008 financial crisis.

Early life and education 
Smith was born January 28, 1949, and raised on a citrus farm in Riverside, California until his family moved to Los Angeles when he was ten. He studied Comparative Literature at Brown University and has a BFA (1975) from the Institute of Film & Television at the Tisch School of the Arts of New York University.

Personal life
He lives in New York City with his wife and producing partner Marcela Gaviria of Bogotá, Colombia. He has five children and six grandchildren.

Career 

In his 40 years producing and reporting, Martin Smith has covered the world: from revolution in Central America and the fall of communism in Russia, to the rise of Al Qaeda and the wars in Afghanistan, Iraq, Syria and Yemen to the inside story of the global financial meltdown. Smith was among the first journalists to investigate Col. Oliver North's clandestine network and one of the first western reporters to investigate the emergence of Osama bin Laden and the Al Qaeda network. 

Smith began his career at CBS News as a film editor in 1976 and in 1982 directed and wrote his first documentary, "Guatemala", which won both a George Polk Award for Investigative Journalism and an Emmy from the Academy of Television Art & Sciences. In 1983, Smith moved to PBS where he produced for the PBS science series NOVA and for FRONTLINE.  In 1986 he produced "Who's Running This War" for FRONTLINE and won his second George Polk award. In 1989 he was executive producer of "Inside Gorbachev's USSR" with Hedrick Smith, winning a third Polk award and DuPont Columbia Gold Baton. In 1990, he was hired as a senior producer at FRONTLINE responsible for editorial supervision of over 50 documentaries in four years.

Between 1994 and 1998, Smith worked with Peter Jennings, the ABC News anchor, as a senior producer and oversaw a series of documentary specials for ABC's Peter Jennings Reporting unit, including "Hiroshima: Why the Bomb was Dropped", recipient of the Edward R. Murrow Award in 1995 and the George Foster Peabody award.

In 1998 Smith founded RAIN Media, an independent production company, which has produced nearly 100 hours of programming for FRONTLINE, including: "The Terrorist and the Superpower", which was produced three years before the attacks on the World Trade Towers and the Pentagon. In the three months following 9/11, Smith produced in short time seminal films on the genesis of the attacks – "Looking for Answers" (2001), and "Saudi Time Bomb?" (2001). The Alfred I. Dupont jurors awarded Smith with his second Gold Baton and said of the body of work: "the series never flinches from showing why terrorist groups harbor such hate for America and includes people whose attitudes toward the United States are undoubtedly offensive to many viewers. Yet all of the programs are balanced and never sensationalized."

Smith continued reporting on Al Qaeda in subsequent years. In the trilogy, "In Search of Al Qaeda", (2002), "Return of the Taliban" (2006) and "Obama's War" (2008), Smith twice interviewed President Pervez Musharaff on Pakistan's duplicitous Afghanistan policy. This work had a major impact on US policy at the time, revealing Pakistan's double dealing. Excerpts from "Return of the Taliban" were used by US commander Karl Eikenberry in high level briefings of Bush administration officials.
Since the 2003 invasion of Iraq, Smith also produced four films on Iraq for FRONTLINE: "Gangs of Iraq" (2007), "Private Warriors" (2005), "Beyond Baghdad" (2004) and "Truth, War and Consequences" (2003).

Smith also has extensively covered business and finance. Notably "HEAT" about how international business leaders are reacting to calls for carbon reduction in the face of climate change, "The Madoff Affair", an investigation into the world's biggest Ponzi scheme, and "Money, Power and Wall Street" about the causes of the global financial crisis. Most recently, Smith completed "The Untouchables" which examined the Justice Department's failure to hold Wall Street bankers accountable for mortgage fraud in the run-up to the 2008 collapse. "The Untouchables" sparked an enormous reaction after its initial airing. Two Senators, citing Smith's interview with a senior Justice Department official in the documentary, demanded that Attorney General Eric Holder explain the department's position regarding not investigating big banks for alleged crimes for fear of collateral consequences. Several US attorneys' offices have screened the film and redoubled their efforts to investigate cases of fraud on Wall Street.

"Money, Power and Wall Street" won Smith his fourth George Polk award.

In recent years, Smith has returned to the Middle East and produced "The Rise of ISIS," "Life in Baghdad," "Inside Assad's Syria," "Confronting ISIS," "Inside Yemen," "Bitter Rivals: Iran and Saudi Arabia" and "The Crown Prince of Saudi Arabia."

In 2020, Smith produced, wrote and directed "The Virus: What Went Wrong?" for FRONTLINE with producing partner Marcela Gaviria.

Selected filmography
 

  CBS Reports: "Guatemala" (1982) Producer, Writer
  CBS Reports: "Central America in Revolt" (1982) Producer, Writer
  CBS Our Town with Bill Moyers: "Toxic" (1983) Producer, Writer
  FRONTLINE: "Crisis in Central America" (1984) Producer, Writer
  FRONTLINE: "Who's Running This War" (18 March 1986) Producer, Writer, Correspondent
  FRONTLINE: "The Bombing of West Philly" (5 May 1987) Producer, Writer
  NOVA: "How Good is Soviet Science?" (20 October 1987) Producer, Writer
  FRONTLINE: "Who Pays for AIDS?" (7 June 1988) Producer, Writer, Correspondent
  FRONTLINE: "The Real Life of Ronald Reagan" (18 January 1989) Producer, Writer 
  WGBH: "Inside Gorbachev's USSR" (April-May 1990) four hour mini-series) Executive Producer, Writer
  FRONTLINE: "After Gorbachev's USSR" (25 February 1992) Senior Producer 
  ABC NEWS:  "Peter Jennings Reporting: In the Name of God" (1995) Producer, Writer
  ABC NEWS:  "Peter Jennings Reporting: Why the Bomb was Dropped" (1995) Senior Producer
  ABC NEWS:  "Peter Jennings Reporting: Pot of Gold" (1996) Producer, Writer
  ABC NEWS:  "Peter Jennings Reporting: The American Game" (1997) Producer, Writer
  FRONTLINE: "The Terrorist and the Superpower" (April 1999) Producer, Writer, Correspondent
  FRONTLINE: "Return of the Czar" (2000) Senior Producer
  FRONTLINE: "Drug Wars" (October 2000) Producer, Writer, Correspondent
  FRONTLINE: "Medicating Kids" (10 April 2001) Writer, Producer
  FRONTLINE: "Hunting Bin Laden" (September 2001) Producer, Writer, Correspondent
  FRONTLINE: "Looking for Answers" (October 2001) Producer, Writer, Correspondent
  FRONTLINE: "Saudi Time Bomb?" (November 2001) Producer, Writer, Correspondent
  FRONTLINE: "Dot Con" (January 2002) Producer, Writer, Correspondent
  ABC NEWS:  "Divided States of America" (September 2002) Producer, Writer
  FRONTLINE: "In Search of Al Queda" (November 2002) Producer, Writer, Correspondent
  FRONTLINE: "Kim's Nuclear Gamble" (April 2003) Producer, Writer, Correspondent
  FRONTLINE: "Truth, War and Consequences" (October 2003) Producer, Writer, Correspondent
  FRONTLINE: "Beyond Baghdad" (February 2004) Producer, Writer, Correspondent
  FRONTLINE: "The Choice 2004" (October 2004) Producer, Writer
  FRONTLINE: "House of Saud" (February 2005) Co-Producer, Writer
  FRONTLINE: "Private Warriors" (June 2005) Producer, Writer, Correspondent
  FRONTLINE: "The Storm" (November 2005) Producer, Writer, Correspondent
  Columbia University: "Telling the Truth I" (January 2006)
  FRONTLINE: "Return of the Taliban" (June 2006) Producer, Writer, Correspondent
  Columbia University: "Telling the Truth II" (October 2006)
  FRONTLINE: "Gangs of Iraq" (April 2007) Producer, Writer, Correspondent
  Columbia University: "Telling the Truth III" (January 2008) 
  FRONTLINE World:"Living on the Edge" (June 2008) Producer, Writer, Correspondent
  FRONTLINE: "Heat" (21 October 2008) Producer, Writer, Correspondent
  FRONTLINE: "The War Briefing" (October 2008) 
  FRONTLINE: "The Madoff Affair" (May 2009) Producer, Writer, Correspondent
  FRONTLINE: "Obama's War" (October 2009) Producer, Writer, Correspondent
  FRONTLINE: "The Quake" (March 2010) Producer, Writer, Correspondent
  FRONTLINE: "College Inc." (May 2010) Producer, Writer, Correspondent 
  FRONTLINE:  "The Spill" (October 2010) Producer, Writer, Correspondent
  FRONTLINE: "The Spy Who Quit" (January 2011) Producer, Writer, Correspondent
  FRONTLINE: "The Private Life of Bradley Manning" (May 2011) Producer, Writer, Correspondent
  FRONTLINE: "WikiSecrets" (May 2011) Producer, Writer, Correspondent
  FRONTLINE: "Educating Sgt. Pantzke" (June 2011) Producer, Writer, Correspondent
  FRONTLINE: "The Interrogator" (September 2011)  Producer, Writer, Correspondent
  FRONTLINE: "The Regime" (8 November 2011) Senior Producer
  FRONTLINE: "Cell Tower Deaths" (May 2012) Senior Producer, Correspondent
  FRONTLINE: "Money, Power and Wall Street" (April 2012) Producer, Writer, Correspondent
  FRONTLINE: "Six Billion Dollar Bet" (June 2012) Producer, Reporter
  FRONTLINE: "The Untouchables" (January 2013) Producer, Writer, Correspondent
  FRONTLINE: "The Retirement Gamble" (23 April 2013) Writer, Correspondent
  FRONTLINE: "Obama at War" (26 May 2013) Producer, Writer, Correspondent
  FRONTLINE: "To Catch a Trader" (7 January 2014) Writer, Correspondent
  FRONTLINE: "The Rise of ISIS" (28 October 2014) Producer, Writer, Correspondent
  FRONTLINE: "Life in Baghdad" (12 March 2015) Producer, Writer, Correspondent
  FRONTLINE: "Inside Assad's Syria" (October 2015) Producer, Writer, Correspondent
  FRONTLINE: "Confronting ISIS" (11 October 2016) Producer, Writer, Correspondent
. FRONTLINE: "Inside Yemen" (18 October 2017) Correspondent
  FRONTLINE: "Bitter Rivals: Iran and Saudi Arabia" (20 & 27 February 2018) Producer, Writer, Correspondent
  FRONTLINE: "Separated: Children at the Border" (31 July 2018) Writer, Correspondent
  FRONTLINE: "The Pensión Gamble" (23 October 2018) Writer, Correspondent
  FRONTLINE: "The Crown Prince of Saudi Arabia" (1 October 2019) Producer, Writer, Correspondent
  FRONTLINE: "Targeting El Paso" (7 January 2020) Correspondent
  FRONTLINE: "The Virus" (16 June 2020) Producer, Director, Writer, Correspondent

Awards and honors

Emmy

 Winner - Outstanding Background/Analysis of a Single Current Story - "Guatemala" (1982)
 Winner - Outstanding Background/Analysis of a Single Current Story - "Drug Wars" (2000)
 Winner - Outstanding Continuing Coverage of a News Story - "The Storm" (2005)
 Winner - Outstanding Documentary on a Business Topic - "The Madoff Affair" (2009)
 Winner - Outstanding Coverage of a News Story - "Money, Power and Wall Street" (2013)
 Winner - Outstanding Business and Economic Reporting - "Money, Power and Wall Street" (2012) 
 Winner - Outstanding Documentary - "United States of Secrets" (2015)
 Winner - Outstanding Coverage of A Current News Story - "United States of Secrets" (2015)

Writers Guild of America

 Winner - Outstanding Script: Television Documentary – Current Events - "Truth War and Consequences" (2003)
 Winner - Outstanding Script: Television Documentary – Current Events - "Return of the Taliban" (2008)
 Winner - Outstanding Script: Television Documentary – Current Events - "The Madoff Affair" (2009)
 Winner - Outstanding Script: Television Documentary – Other Than Current Events - "WikiSecrets" (2012)
 Winner - Outstanding Script: Television News – Regularly Scheduled, Bulletin or Breaking News - "Educating Sergeant Pantzke" (2012)
 Winner - Outstanding Script: Television Documentary – Current Events - "Money Power and Wall Street" (2013)
 Winner - Outstanding Script: Television Documentary – Current Events - "Egypt In Crisis" (2014)
 Winner - Outstanding Script: Television Documentary – Current Events - Confronting ISIS (2018)

The George Foster Peabody Award

 George Foster Peabody Award FRONTLINE - "Crisis in Central America" 1985
 George Foster Peabody Award FRONTLINE - "Drug Wars" 2000
 George Foster Peabody Award FRONTLINE - "The Madoff Affair" 2009
 George Foster Peabody Award FRONTLINE - "The United States of Secrets" 2014
 George Foster Peabody Award FRONTLINE - "Confronting ISIS" 2016
 George Foster Peabody Award FRONTLINE - "Separated: Children at the Border" 2019

Alfred I. duPont-Columbia Award

Gold Baton

 "Inside Gorbachev's USSR" (1990)
 "Hunting bin Laden" (2002)
 "Looking for Answers" (2002)
 "Saudi Time Bomb?" (2002)
 "Bitter Rivals: Iran and Saudi Arabia" (2019)

Silver Baton

 "Truth War and Consequences" - (2003)
 "The United States of Secrets" (2015)

George Polk Award

 George Polk Award for Network Television Reporting - CBS Reports: "Guatemala", 1983
 George Polk Award for International Television Reporting - FRONTLINE: "Who's Running This War", 1986
 George Polk Award for Documentary Television Reporting - WGBH: "Inside Gorbachev's USSR" 1990
 George Polk Award for Documentary Television Reporting - FRONTLINE: "Money, Power and Wall Street", 2012

The Overseas Press Club Awards

 Whitman Bassow Award for Best Reporting in Any Medium on International Environmental Issues - "Heat" (2008)
 Edward R. Murrow Award for Best Television Interpretation or Documentary on International Affairs - "Obama's War" (2009)

Prix Italia Award

 Documentary of the Year FRONTLINE - "The Bombing of West Philly" - 1987

Nancy Dickerson Whitehead Award for Excellence in Reporting on Drug and Alcohol Problems

 "Drug Wars", 2001

Society of Environmental Journalists' Award

 Kevin Carmody Award for Outstanding In-depth Reporting, "The Spill", 2011

Career honors

 Selected Recipient for the Top 100 Journalism Works of the Decade awarded by New York University (2000–2010) for "Truth, War and Consequences"
 The Edward Weintal Special Citation in recognition of a career of distinguished reporting on foreign policy and diplomacy by the Institute for the Study of Diplomacy at Georgetown University. Awarded to Martin Smith 2007.
 John Chancellor Award for Excellence in Journalism Columbia University Awarded to Martin Smith 2014

References 

 Martin Smith PBS. Retrieved: 2018-02-21.
 Producers: Martin Smith PBS. Retrieved: 2018-02-21.

Citations 

Living people
American documentary filmmakers
Emmy Award winners
Peabody Award winners
1949 births